"Dancing Feet" is a song by Norwegian record producer and DJ Kygo, featuring American band DNCE. It was released as a single through RCA Records on 25 February 2022. The production was handled by Kygo and David Stewart and the vocals were solely handled by DNCE's lead singer, Joe Jonas. The producers wrote the song alongside Rami Yacoub and Jess Agombar. It also serves as DNCE's comeback single since their return after a three-year-long hiatus that started after 2018 was over.

Background and promotion
Joe Jonas had been teasing "Dancing Feet" on the video-sharing app TikTok for several weeks prior to its release, with several video teasers and videos with the song in the background, starting in mid-January 2022.

On 7 February 2022, DNCE announced their return as a band after a hiatus that lasted about three years since 2018 ended, and Jonas was interviewed by Rolling Stone on the same day, in which he said of the song: "It's really happy. It's that feeling of not really giving a fuck and enjoying life to the fullest". The song has been described as "a perfect reintroduction, a crisp Eighties-inspired bop primed for all your dance-floor needs" and "fit in perfectly with the material already written for the band's return". Four days later, Kygo was interviewed by people People, in which he shared his thoughts about collaborating with Jonas on the song and DNCE's reunion: "I only met Joe briefly at a festival a couple of years ago, but he's a super nice guy" and "Joe recorded vocals and it just sounded amazing", adding that "I feel like we're all just very excited about this song, and obviously it's very cool to be part of their comeback". On 12 February 2022, Kygo brought DNCE out for his performance at the Sports Illustrated The Party x Palm Tree Crew in Century Park for the Super Bowl LVI weekend show that day, in which they collectively performed the song live for the first time. The official music video was also shot during that week. Kygo has also been reported to be working with DNCE on the band's upcoming second studio album.

Composition and lyrics
"Dancing Feet" is a funk song that is set in the key of C major. It sees Jonas sing "over a characteristically breezy Kygo melody", especially on the song's chorus: "'Cause these dancing feet don't cry to the rhythm, they cry for you / And every Saturday night that you ain't here, my tears are blue / And these blinding lights, they shine so bright like we're on the moon / But I don't wanna dancе another beat, no, unless it's with you".

Music video
The official music video for "Dancing Feet", directed by Johannes Lovund, premiered on 28 February 2022, coinciding with the three-year-anniversary of the reunion of Jonas' other band, the Jonas Brothers. It was originally set to be released alongside the song three days before, but was pushed back in respect of the Ukraine-Russia conflict going on at the time. It was shot in Miami, Florida. The video sees Kygo and the three DNCE members (Jonas, Jack Lawless, and JinJoo Lee) at the Palm Tree Resort, imitating Miami Vice, as they do favors and run errands for the rich people in the area, such as parking their cars and playing tennis with them, and then give the music for a party. The next day, after working hard, they sneak into a nightclub and dance on a light-up floor.

Credits and personnel

 Kygo – production, songwriting
 DNCE
 Joe Jonas – vocals
 Jack Lawless – drums
 JinJoo Lee – guitar
 David Stewart – production, songwriting, vocal production
 Rami Yacoub – songwriting
 Jess Agombar – songwriting
 Sean Lascelles – miscellaneous production
 Serban Ghenea – mixing
 Randy Merrill – mastering
 John Hanes – engineering

Charts

Weekly charts

Monthly charts

Year-end charts

Release history

References

2022 singles
2022 songs
RCA Records singles
Kygo songs
DNCE songs
Song recordings produced by Kygo
Songs written by Kygo
Songs written by Rami Yacoub
Funk songs